Vitali Viktorovich Shakhov (born 9 January 1991) is a Russian football centre-back. He plays for FC Spartak Kostroma.

Club career
He made his debut in the Russian Second Division for FC Torpedo Armavir on 26 April 2011 in a game against FC SKA Rostov-on-Don.

Honours

Club
FC Tosno
 Russian Cup: 2017–18

References

1991 births
Sportspeople from Krasnodar Krai
Living people
Russian footballers
Association football defenders
FC Chernomorets Novorossiysk players
FC Fakel Voronezh players
FC Tom Tomsk players
FC Armavir players
FC Tosno players
FC Baltika Kaliningrad players
FC Orenburg players
FC Tambov players
FC Kuban Krasnodar players
FC Rotor Volgograd players
FC Spartak Kostroma players
Russian Premier League players
Russian First League players
Russian Second League players